Fernand Decanali (7 July 1925 – 9 January 2017) was a French cyclist. He was born in Marseille. He won a gold medal in the team pursuit at the 1948 Summer Olympics in London, together with Pierre Adam, Charles Coste and Serge Blusson.

References

External links
 

1925 births
2017 deaths
Cyclists from Marseille
French male cyclists
Cyclists at the 1948 Summer Olympics
Olympic cyclists of France
Olympic gold medalists for France
Olympic medalists in cycling
Medalists at the 1948 Summer Olympics
French track cyclists